The United States ambassador to the Republic of Cuba is the official representative of the president of the United States to the head of state of Cuba, and serves as the head of the Embassy of the United States in Havana. Direct bilateral diplomatic relations did not exist between the two countries from 1961 to 2015. President Dwight D. Eisenhower severed relations following the Cuban Revolution on January 3, 1961. Relations were subsequently restored by Cuban President Raul Castro and President Barack Obama on July 20, 2015.

With the restoration of relations in 2015, the president may nominate an ambassador, though the position has remained vacant since 1960. The embassy is currently run by a Chargé d'affaires ad interim, Benjamin G. Ziff. The Chargé d'affaires and the embassy staff at large work in the American Embassy on the Malecón in Havana.

History

Cuba was the last major Spanish colony to gain independence, following a lengthy struggle that began in 1868. José Martí, Cuba's national hero, helped initiate the final push for independence in 1895. In 1898, the United States fought a brief war known as the Spanish–American War, after the USS Maine sank in Havana Harbor on February 15, 1898, due to an explosion of undetermined origin. In December 1898, Spain relinquished control of Cuba to the United States with the Treaty of Paris. On May 20, 1902, the United States granted Cuba its independence but retained the right to intervene to preserve Cuban independence and stability in accordance with the Platt Amendment.

In 1902 the US established an embassy in Havana and appointed its first ambassador, Herbert G. Squiers. In 1934, the Platt Amendment was repealed. The United States and Cuba concluded a Treaty of Relations in 1934 which, among other things, continued the 1903 agreements that leased the Guantanamo Bay Naval Base to the United States. In 1959 Fidel Castro's 26th of July Movement overthrew the government of Fulgencio Batista and Batista fled the country on January 1, 1959. Relations between the United States and Cuba deteriorated rapidly as the Cuban government expropriated US properties and developed close ties with the Soviet Union. In October 1960, the US recalled its ambassador to protest Castro's policies. On January 3, 1961, the US withdrew diplomatic recognition of the Cuban government and closed the embassy in Havana. On September 1, 1977, the US established the United States Interests Section in Havana, located in its former embassy and operated under the auspices of the Embassy of Switzerland in Havana. The Interests Section was headed by Chief of Mission rather than an ambassador. Bilateral relations between the two governments resumed on July 20, 2015.

Ambassadors

Normal relations were severed in January 1961 and were not re-established until July 2015. An ambassador to Cuba has not been appointed since the re-establishment of diplomatic relations. All the following served Chargé d'affaires ad interim.
 Jeffrey DeLaurentis from July 20, 2015, to July 7, 2017
 Scott Hamilton from July 7 to October 26, 2017
 Lawrence J. Gumbiner from October 26, 2017, to February 11, 2018
 Philip Goldberg from February 11 to July 20, 2018
 Mara Tekach from July 20, 2018 to July 21, 2020
 Timothy Zúñiga-Brown from July 31, 2020, to July 14, 2022
 Benjamin G. Ziff from July 14, 2022

Chiefs of the US Interests Section
The Interests Section operated from September 1, 1977, to July 20, 2015.

 1977–1979: Lyle Franklin Lane
 1979–1982: Wayne S. Smith
 1982–1985: John Ferch
 1985–1987: Curtis W. Kamman
 1987–1990: John J. Taylor
 1990–1993: Alan H. Flanigan
 1993–1996: Joseph Sullivan
 1996–1999: Michael Kozak
 1999–2002: Vicki Huddleston
 2002–2005: James Cason
 2005–2008: Michael E. Parmly
 2008–2010: Jonathan D. Farrar
 2010–2011: Vacant
 September 2011 – 2014: John Caulfield
 August 2014 – July 20, 2015: Jeffrey DeLaurentis

Notes

See also
 Cuba–United States relations
 Foreign relations of Cuba
 Ambassadors of the United States

Notes

References
 United States Department of State: Background notes on Cuba

External links
 United States Department of State: Chiefs of Mission for Cuba
 United States Department of State: Cuba
 United States Embassy in Havana

 
United States
Cuba
Cuba